East Worthing and Shoreham is a constituency represented in the House of Commons of the UK Parliament since 1997 by Tim Loughton of the Conservative Party.

Boundaries

The District of Adur, and the Borough of Worthing wards of Broadwater, Gaisford, Offington, and Selden.

The constituency covers an eastern portion of Worthing, the town of Shoreham-by-Sea, Lancing and three nearby inland villages in the Adur valley, all communities within the county of West Sussex.

History
Under the Boundary Commission's fourth review, enacted in time for the 1997 election, the larger Shoreham portion of this constituency was taken from the disbanded Shoreham seat and the minor East Worthing portion had been in the disbanded Worthing seat.

Before 1974, the Shoreham seat had been a part of the Arundel and Shoreham seat.

Between 1945 and 1950, the whole area was in the Worthing seat and between 1918 and 1945 (on which the Boundary Commission was formed and carried out its first periodic review), in the Horsham and Worthing seat.

Political history
Although from 2001 to 2015 this was an unquestionably safe seat for the Conservative Party, its safety has significantly declined since then, especially in 2017 when Labour reduced the Conservative percentage majority to single figures. It has now succeeded Crawley as Labour's principal target seat in the county of West Sussex, though still requiring a substantial swing.

Notable candidates 
The competitive hustings in September 2007 of the local Labour Party selected Emily Benn, granddaughter of Tony Benn and niece of Hilary Benn, former Secretaries of State, then aged 17, to contest the 2010 general election, making her the youngest ever Labour parliamentary candidate: had she been elected, she would have been the youngest MP since the Reform Act 1832. Her father Stephen Benn is Viscount Stansgate, succeeding his father.

Labour selected Latest TV newsreader Sophie Cook to be their candidate in the 2017 general election. Had she been elected, she would have been the United Kingdom's first transgender MP. Although she failed to win the seat, she achieved the best ever result of any non-Conservative Party candidate in any Worthing-based constituency, receiving 20,882 votes to the Conservatives' 25,988.

Constituency profile
Shoreham can be viewed with Worthing as less of an economic force than the neighbouring local government district, the City of Brighton and Hove, with a majority of houses with larger gardens, fewer listed buildings but Shoreham's large boat harbour facility an amenity for visitors, residents, - mooring and maintenance for people living close enough to the county, rival harbours being as far away as Chichester and Newhaven.  Much work is in the service sector, including a major presence of sharedealing and banking service and processing facilities in the borough (see Lancing, West Sussex) and a slightly greater proportion of people are retired compared to the national average (2.11% of the population greater, at 15.8%).

Workless claimants who were registered jobseekers were in November 2012 lower than the national average of 3.8%, at 2.6% of the population based on a statistical compilation by The Guardian.

Members of Parliament

Elections

Elections in the 2010s

Sophie Cook withdrew from the 2019 election, but she remained on the ballot paper as this decision was made after the statement of persons nominated was released.

Elections in the 2000s

Elections in the 1990s

See also
List of parliamentary constituencies in West Sussex

Notes

References

Sources
Election result, 2005 (BBC)
Election results, 1997 - 2001 (BBC)
Election results, 1997 - 2001 (Election Demon)
Election results, 1997 - 2005  (Guardian)

Parliamentary constituencies in South East England
Constituencies of the Parliament of the United Kingdom established in 1997
Politics of West Sussex
Adur District
Politics of Worthing